Mael Isa Mac Mael Coluim (died Good Friday, 1136) was described upon his death as "chief keeper of the calendar of Ard-Macha, its chief antiquary and librarian". By the 19th century the surname appears to have been rendered as McCollum.

The Abbot of Armagh at this time was Niall mac Áeda meic Máel Ísu, a member of the Clann Sinaig, while the Archbishop of Armagh was Máel Máedóc Ua Morgair.

See also

 Padraic Colum
 Irish calendar

References

1136 deaths
Medieval Gaels from Ireland
People from County Armagh
12th-century Irish people
Irish librarians
Irish antiquarians
Chronologists
Year of birth unknown